Lindsay Burlet (born 6 June 1994) is a French handballer who plays for Brest Bretagne Handball.

Achievements 
Championnat de France
Winner: 2016, 2017
Coupe de France:
Winner: 2017

References

French female handball players
1994 births
Living people
People from Villepinte, Seine-Saint-Denis
Sportspeople from Seine-Saint-Denis